Thomas Sommer Arnoldsen (born 11 January 2002) is a Danish handball player for Skanderborg Aarhus Håndbold and the Danish national team. From 2023 he has a contract with Aalborg Håndbold.

He represented Denmark at the 2022 European Men's Under-20 Handball Championship.

Individual awards 
 All-Star team as Best centre back at the 2022 European Men's U-20 Handball Championship
 Talent of the year in the Danish men's handball league 2021/22

References

2002 births
Living people
Danish male handball players